Zsuzsa Malovecz (born 21 May 1962 in Budapest) is a retired female javelin thrower from Hungary who represented her native country at the 1988 Summer Olympics. She set her personal best (67.18 metres) in 1988.

Achievements

References

sports-reference

1962 births
Living people
Hungarian female javelin throwers
Athletes (track and field) at the 1988 Summer Olympics
Olympic athletes of Hungary
Athletes from Budapest